Gerry Leonard is an Irish lead guitarist and solo artist, known for his harmonic and ambient guitar style and for his work with David Bowie. He has lived and worked in Dublin, Copenhagen, and Manhattan.

Hinterland
From Clontarf in Dublin, Leonard played in bands as a teen, influenced by a mixture of Led Zeppelin, punk and post punk and whatever was playing on Top of the Pops. Early on, he worked as a tape operator in Lombard Sound studios in Dublin, where one job was recording a demo tape by a sixteen-year-old Sinéad O'Connor, and he got to see U2 and Phil Lynott at work. He then studied classical guitar for five years at the Municipal College of Music in Dublin, particularly interested in exploring the instrument's harmonic possibilities. In 1989 he moved to Copenhagen, where he formed the band Hinterland with Donal Coughlan. Leonard handled guitars and production and Coughlan sang and played bass and keyboards, with writing duties shared by both. The band released an album with Island, Kissing the Roof of Heaven in 1990 and toured in Ireland, the UK, Germany and Switzerland. The last Hinterland release was an EP, Resurrect, in 1992.

Session and touring musician, co-writer, producer
New York's East Village was the next stop for Leonard, where he established himself as a solo performer, producer, and as a session player. He has recorded and toured, usually as lead guitarist, with Duncan Sheik, Laurie Anderson, Jonatha Brooke, Cyndi Lauper, Sophie B. Hawkins, Avril Lavigne and Chris Botti, among others. In addition to playing guitar for Rufus Wainwright, Leonard was the musical director for Wainwright's Milwaukee at Last!!! tour and subsequent live album. He works a lot with Suzanne Vega, touring with her effectively as a duo; he produced and is given writing credits on all the songs on her album, Tales from the Realm of the Queen of Pentacles (Amanuensis Productions, 2014).

As a producer, Leonard has also worked on albums for artists Donna Lewis (In the Pink), Ari Hest (The Fire Plays), Donnie Mortimer (Ten Eventful Years), the Czech band Čechomor (Mistečko), and Pamela Sue Mann. Of his playing on the latter's L'Oeuf, Laurie Anderson said "I've always been a fan of Gerry Leonard's lush and groovy parts so that makes the listening experience even deeper."

Soundtracks
Leonard has worked in film and theatre. His guitar is featured on Peter Nashel's scores for The Deep End and Bee Season, on Trevor Jones's soundtrack for CrissCross, and on Roger Waters's song for The Last Mimzy. He wrote and performed the score for the Irish independent movie 32A, directed by Marian Quinn, and for Quinn's earlier short film Come To (1998). He has also been involved with some of Duncan Sheik's theatrical works, including Whisper House, staged in San Diego in January 2010. He provided music for a performance of "Twelfth Night" at Shakespeare in the Park in New York.

With David Bowie
Leonard worked extensively with David Bowie, featuring on the Heathen,   Reality and The Next Day albums. He toured with Bowie on the Heathen and Reality tours, and was musical director for the Reality tour and DVD. He has the only original writing credits other than Bowie on The Next Day, for the songs "Boss of Me" and "I'll Take You There".

Bowie and Leonard were introduced by Mark Plati: Leonard first worked with Bowie on a track from the abandoned album Toy which Plati was producing. Besides availing of Leonard's own style, Bowie also needed him live as he was equally able to cover the stranger guitar parts on older Bowie songs, such as those originally played by Robert Fripp or Adrian Belew, and to rock out. Leonard's first live appearance with Bowie was for the straight-through performance of the entirety of both Heathen and Low in the Roseland Ballroom in 2002.

In 2013, he participated in an April Fools' Day spoof involving an announcement that Bowie would be representing Germany in that year's Eurovision Song Contest.

Personal work

Spooky Ghost
As a solo artist, Leonard works under the name Spooky Ghost, Donal Coughlan's description of Leonard's guitar sound. He worked on the first Spooky Ghost album from 1996 to 1998, recording it in his East Village apartment. The result, also titled Spooky Ghost, was primarily an exploration of ambient guitar atmospherics. A second Spooky Ghost album, The Light Machine was released in 2002. On this recording, Spooky Ghost was expanded to a trio, featuring Jay Bellerose (drums, percussion and tabla) and Paul Bryan (bass, keyboards and production). Both musicians had already contributed to Spooky Ghost and the trio is the band's live configuration. David Bowie described The Light Machine as "Quite the most beautiful and moving piece of work I have possessed in a long time." Frank Goodman called it a "sonically brave, and innovative, and challenging" work that enables the jaded listener hear music again.

Bowsie
Leonard's work with Spooky Ghost focuses on soundscapes and ambient explorations. As a session musician he works extensively with both rock and folk musicians. He also remains in touch with the musical traditions of his Irish roots, from the naming of his publishing company for Spooky Ghost,  Ceol na Phúca (Irish for "ghost music"), to his work with Irish and Irish-influenced folk musicians, and with Irish film makers. In particular, Leonard has worked with folk musician and fellow Dubliner Susan McKeown. The two have performed joint concerts, and Leonard has contributed to several of McKeown's recordings. McKeown is known for her encyclopaedic repertoire of folk songs and under the name Bowsie, she and Leonard explore old songs in an expanded setting of ambient soundscapes and loops. (A "bowsie" is a word used in Ireland for a rascal or jack-the-lad.)

Equipment
The guitar is Leonard's main instrument, but he also plays other stringed instruments such as bass and mandolin, as well as keyboards. His use of the EBow is prominently featured on the Bowie single, New Killer Star.  He sings on some Spooky Ghost pieces and has sometimes sung backing vocals when recording with other artists. He is particularly known for his construction of ambient pieces and soundscapes using an extensive variety of loops and digital effects. In this regard, he has been compared to guitarists like Robert Fripp, but he points out that much of what he himself would take from Fripp is that all the sonic shaping never neglects melody and harmony. Performing live, he uses samples and live loops to provide a texture against which he improvises. He explores the harmonic possibilities of the guitar, and is inspired by the drones used in both Indian and Celtic music. Drones provide a background and a frame for Leonard's spatial approach to composition, which he compares both to painting and architecture.

Leonard is a self-confessed geek when it comes to guitars and equipment. Spooky Ghost once even sold a screwdriver as a promotional item. Although his signature sound is based in loops and processing, he prefers the use of pedals and other more physical control interfaces to working on computers, preferring the effect of a physical box on physical sound. He admits to using too much equipment, but claims that all the blinking lights comfort him. But for all the depth and subtlety he can get from complicated set-ups he also stresses how much can be achieved with a guitar and a couple of pedals; he also enjoys the challenge of getting a lot of power from a small rig. 
 Rig based around a TC Electronic G Force (pre-sets self-programmed from the ground up) and a Voodoo Labs switching system to combine analogue and digital
 Four additional analogue pedals, three for distortion (as, says Leonard, digital distortion is "pretty hideous" if not a special effect), ranging from subtle to extreme (a Voodoo Labs Sparkle Drive, an Ibanez Tube Screamer (TS 9), an EHX Little Big Muff; an EHX Pog octave pedal for polyphonic octave sounds
 Hybrid electric-acoustic guitar built on a custom PRS hollow body: active piezo pick-up for acoustic sound, with a separate output, and a two pick-up electric system with separate output
 Acoustic side of guitar run through a Boss RE 20 looper pedal into DI box 
 Line 6 DL 4 delay/looper on electric side
 Loopers are not connected but often used together live, relying on manual synching, timing info on acoustic side, ambient on electric
 Mesa Boogie Lonestar special amp (Fender Deluxe as backup)
 All fits in three Pelican cases

Discography

Albums
 Hinterland – Kissing the Roof of Heaven (1990)
 Hinterland - Resurrect (1992)
 Spooky Ghost – Spooky Ghost (1998)
 Spooky Ghost –  The Light Machine (2002)
 Spooky Ghost – Official Bootleg (2004; recorded live at The Chance, Poughkeepsie)
 Spooky Ghost - Official Bootleg, Volume 2 (2015; recording at Rockwood Music Hall, New York City)
 Spooky Ghost - Viral Times, Volume One (2020)
 Spooky Ghost - Viral Times, Volume Two (2020)
 Bowsie – Susan McKeown said a Bowsie record would come out in 2012, but it hasn't yet appeared

Singles
 Hinterland – "Dark Hill" (1989)
 Hinterland – "Desert Boots" (1990)
 Hinterland – "Resurrect" EP (1992)

References

External links

 Gerry Leonard and Spooky Ghost: 
 Bowsie on myspace

Irish guitarists
Irish male guitarists
Musicians from Dublin (city)
Irish record producers
Living people
1960s births